Palm Springs North is an unincorporated community and census-designated place (CDP) in Miami-Dade County, Florida, United States. The population was 5,030 at the 2020 census.

Geography
It is bordered to the south by the town of Miami Lakes and to the east by the unincorporated community of Country Club.

Demographics

2020 census

As of the 2020 United States census, there were 5,030 people, 1,478 households, and 1,193 families residing in the CDP.

2000 census
As of the census of 2000, there were 5,460 people, 1,630 households, and 1,449 families residing in the CDP. The racial makeup of the CDP was 93.0% White (of which 33.2% were Hispanic/Latino White,) 0.8% African American, 0.2% Native American, 0.6% Asian, 3.2% from other races, and 2.3% from two or more races.

There were 1,630 households, out of which 43.3% had children under the age of 18 living with them, 72.5% were married couples living together, 11.2% had a female householder with no husband present, and 11.1% were non-families. 8.3% of all households were made up of individuals, and 3.1% had someone living alone who was 65 years of age or older.  The average household size was 3.33 and the average family size was 3.49.

In the CDP, the population was spread out, with 27.4% under the age of 18, 6.4% from 18 to 24, 31.8% from 25 to 44, 23.4% from 45 to 64, and 11.0% who were 65 years of age or older.  The median age was 36 years. For every 100 females, there were 96.1 males.  For every 100 females age 18 and over, there were 93.4 males.

The median income for a household in the CDP was $62,161, and the median income for a family was $64,428. Males had a median income of $39,886 versus $28,281 for females. The per capita income for the CDP was $20,383.  About 3.6% of families and 4.4% of the population were below the poverty line, including 2.1% of those under age 18 and 15.9% of those age 65 or over.

As of 2000, speakers of Spanish as a first language accounted for 6.18% of residents, while English made up 93.82% of the population.

As of 2000, Palm Springs North had the eleventh highest percentage of Cuban residents, with 43.6% of the Hispanic/Latino population self-identifying as such, while it had the sixty-third highest percentage of Colombians, at 2.4% of all residents.

Education
Public schools that serve Palm Springs North are:
Palm Springs North Elementary School
Spanish Lake Elementary School
Lawton Chiles Middle School
American Senior High School 
Barbara Goleman Senior High School
Private schools that serve Palm Springs North are:
Mother of Our Redeemer Catholic School
Dade Christian School

Parks and recreation 
Norman and Jean Reach Park
Palm Springs North Pool (NW)

References

Census-designated places in Miami-Dade County, Florida
Census-designated places in Florida